Natalia Shlyapina ( Mokshanova; born 13 July 1983) is a former Russian football forward, who played for Rossiyanka in the Russian Championship. Before signing for Rossiyanka in 2005 she was a mini football and futsal player.

She is a member of the Russian national team.

Titles
 Three Russian leagues (2005, 2006, 2010)
 Five Russian Cups (2005, 2006, 2008, 2009, 2010)

References

1983 births
Living people
Russian women's footballers
Russia women's international footballers
WFC Rossiyanka players
Women's association football forwards
FC Chertanovo Moscow (women) players
Russian Women's Football Championship players